Sebastián Alberto Palacios (born 20 January 1992) is an Argentine professional footballer who plays as a right winger for Greek Super League club Panathinaikos.

Club career
Boca Juniors

Sebastian Palacios from the age of 11 he joined the academy of Boca Juniors, one of the top clubs in Argentina. At the age of 21 he made his debut in the first team and within a period of two months he played in six official games. In the summer of 2013, he was loaned to Unión de Santa Fe, a Primera Nacional club, where he was a key player,having 39 appearances and 9 goals. A season later, Boca loaned him to Arsenal Sarandi to test his progress in a Primera División club. After 18 appearances and 2 goals in 6 months he returned to Boca Juniors in January 2015.

At the end of the 2015 season with 30 appearances, 6 goals and 3 assists along with the Primera División title of champion was one of the protagonists of the campaign. In the first half of 2016 he was again a key player with 19 appearances and 2 goals. 

Talleres

In the summer of 2016, Talleres de Córdoba bought him from Boca, and with 29 appearances and 9 goals, Palacios emerged as the protagonist of his new club. 

Pachuca

After two years, in January 2018 Talleres accepted an offer for almost €5 million from the Mexican club Pachuca.

In Mexico, Palacios had 16 appearances and 7 goals in just 4 months. The first half of the 2018–19 Liga MX season was not so productive, and Pachuca accepted the offer of his previous club Talleres on a season loan. Palacios managed to score 7 times in 16 games and consequently got a second transfer, as Pachuca accepted a €2.3 million offer from [[Club Atlético 

Independiente

Independiente|Independiente]]. He initially played for the club (2 goals in 14 appearances), but after six months he loaned out to Newell's Old Boys  for the rest of the season. He played there for almost a season and returned in the winter of 2021 to Independiente.

Panathinaikos 

On 31 August 2021, Palacios signed a 3 year contract with Greek side Panathinaikos for an undisclosed fee. On October 16th 2021, Palacios scored his first goal for the club in a 4-1 win against Ionikos. He finished his first season as Panathinaikos's top scorer with 13 goals at all competitions,11 at Super League, and 2 at the Greek Cup. These goals helped  Panathinaikos to win this Cup for the first time in 8 years.

Career Statistics

Club

Honours
Boca Juniors
 Primera División: 2015
 Copa Argentina: 2014–15

Panathinaikos
Greek Cup: 2021–22
Individual
Panathinaikos Player of the Year: 2021–22
Super League Greece Foreign Player of the Year: 2021–22
Super League Greece Player of the Month: February 2022, March 2022
Super League Greece–Fantasy League Award Winger of the Year: 2021–22
Super League Greece Team of the Year: 2021–22

References 

1992 births
Living people
Argentine footballers
Argentine expatriate footballers
Argentine Primera División players
Primera Nacional players
Liga MX players
Super League Greece players
Boca Juniors footballers
Arsenal de Sarandí footballers
Unión de Santa Fe footballers
Talleres de Córdoba footballers
C.F. Pachuca players
Club Atlético Independiente footballers
Newell's Old Boys footballers
Panathinaikos F.C. players
Expatriate footballers in Mexico
Expatriate footballers in Greece
Argentine expatriate sportspeople in Mexico
Argentine expatriate sportspeople in Greece
Association football forwards
Sportspeople from San Miguel de Tucumán